Jamal Agnew (born April 3, 1995) is an American football wide receiver and return specialist for the Jacksonville Jaguars of the National Football League (NFL). He played college football at San Diego. On September 26, 2021, he tied the NFL record for the longest play with a 109 yard return off a missed field goal.

Early years
Agnew attended and played high school football at Point Loma High School. Jamal Agnew constantly stood out among his peers at Point Loma; however, due to his size, he was not offered a scholarship to any major D1 school.

College career
Agnew attended and played college football for the San Diego Toreros, where he played cornerback and returned kicks.  He finished his college career with 148 tackles and 11 interceptions.  As a senior, he returned 17 punts for 216 yards.

Professional career

Detroit Lions
Agnew played in the 2017 NFLPA Collegiate Bowl. The Detroit Lions then selected Agnew in the fifth round (165th overall) of the 2017 NFL Draft. Following 2008 draftee Josh Johnson, he became the second player in San Diego Torrero history to be drafted. On May 12, 2017, the Lions signed Agnew to a four-year, $2.65 million contract with a signing bonus of $258,364.

In Week 2 on Monday Night Football, Agnew scored his first NFL touchdown on an 88-yard punt return in the fourth quarter in a 24–10 win over the New York Giants, earning him NFC Special Teams Player of the Week. In Week 6, against the New Orleans Saints, he recorded a 74-yard punt return touchdown in the fourth quarter. In Week 8, against the Pittsburgh Steelers, he recorded his first NFL reception, a 12-yard catch. He finished the 2017 season with 29 punt returns for 447 net yards and two punt return touchdowns to go along with 11 kickoff returns for 196 net yards.

On October 15, 2018, Agnew was placed on injured reserve with a knee injury. He was activated off injured reserve on December 19, 2018. In six games, he had eight kickoff returns for 216 net yards and 12 punt returns for 57 net yards.

In Week 3 of the 2019 season against the Philadelphia Eagles, Agnew returned a kick for a 100-yard touchdown in the 27-24 win. In Week 16, against the Denver Broncos, he had a 64-yard punt return for a touchdown in the 27–17 loss.

On May 26, 2020, it was announced that Agnew would transition from cornerback to full time wide receiver.

Jacksonville Jaguars
On March 17, 2021, Agnew signed a three-year, $14.25 million contract with the Jacksonville Jaguars. In a Week 2 loss to the Denver Broncos, Agnew scored his first touchdown for the Jaguars with a 102 yard kick-off return, setting a franchise record for longest kick return in the process. On September 26, 2021, the following week against the Arizona Cardinals, he scored another touchdown on a 109 yard return of a missed 68 yard field goal attempt, tying the NFL record for longest play with Antonio Cromartie and Cordarrelle Patterson, at the end of the first half in the 19–31 loss. He suffered a hip injury in Week 11 and was placed on injured reserve on November 22, 2021.

In 2022, Agnew played in 15 games, gaining 1,025 all-purpose yards and averaging 26 yards per kickoff return.  In the Jaguars 31-30 win over the Los Angeles Chargers in the wildcard round of the playoffs, he returned 4 kickoffs for 134 yards.  In the Jaguars divisional round loss to the Kansas City Chiefs, Agnew returned 3 kickoffs for 131 yards, 3 punts for 23, and had 7 yards from scrimmage.  However, he committed a costly fourth quarter fumble in the opposing red zone.

He was named to 2023 Pro Bowl after Baltimore Ravens' kick returner Devin Duvernay was deemed unable to play due to injury.

References

External links
Detroit Lions bio
San Diego Toreros bio

1995 births
American football cornerbacks
American football return specialists
American football wide receivers
Detroit Lions players
Jacksonville Jaguars players
Living people
Players of American football from San Diego
San Diego Toreros football players
American Conference Pro Bowl players